The Feast of the Sacred Heart is a feast day in the liturgical calendar of the Roman Rite of the Catholic Church and certain Anglo-Catholic communities that is dedicated to the Sacred Heart. According to the General Roman Calendar since 1969, it is formally known as the Solemnity of the Most Sacred Heart of Jesus and falls on the Friday that follows the second Sunday after Pentecost, which is also the Friday after the former octave of Corpus Christi. Some Anglican Franciscans keep the feast under the name (The) Divine Compassion of Christ.

History

The first liturgical feast of the Sacred Heart was celebrated, with episcopal approval, on 31 August 1670, in the major seminary of Rennes, France, through the efforts of John Eudes.  The Mass and Office composed by Eudes were adopted elsewhere also, especially in connection with the spread of devotion to the Sacred Heart following on the reported revelations to Margaret Mary Alacoque and Mary of the Divine Heart. 

A Mass of the Sacred Heart won papal approval for use in Poland and Portugal in 1765, and another was approved for Venice, Austria and Spain in 1788. Finally, in 1856, Pope Pius IX established the Feast of the Sacred Heart as obligatory for the whole church of Roman Rite, to be celebrated on the Friday after the Octave of Corpus Christi. In June 1889, Leo XIII raised the feast to the dignity of the first class. In 1928, Pope Pius XI raised the feast to the highest rank, Double of the First Class, and added an octave; the liturgical reforms of Pope Pius XII suppressed this octave, removing also most other octaves.  

The Mass prayers and readings approved on that occasion were replaced with new texts in 1929, and the lectionary published to accompany the 1970 Roman Missal provides three sets of readings, one for each year of the festive three-year liturgical cycle.

Priests may use this Mass, celebrated with white vestments, as a Votive Mass on other days also, especially on the first Friday of each month (unless falling on a day of higher rank). On this first Fridays it is also common to hold an Eucharistic adoration for a few hours (see First Friday devotion).

In Austria and South Tyrol, the so-called Sacred Heart Sunday, that is the Sunday after the Feast of the Sacred Heart, is also celebrated. Numerous processions take place on this day. Sacred Heart Fires are lit in the Bozen (Bolzano) area of Italy, among others.

Since 2002, the Solemnity of the Sacred Heart of Jesus is also a special day of prayer for the sanctification of priests. In 2009, the feast marked the beginning of a "Year for Priests".

Dates
The feast is celebrated on the third Friday after Pentecost, the first one after the former octave of  Feast of Corpus Christi. The earliest possible date is May 29, as in 1818 and 2285. The latest possible date is July 2, as in 1943 and 2038. Therefore, it is the last feast date of the year dependent on the date of Easter.

Recent dates through to 2030:

  – 
  –

See also
 Prayer of Consecration to the Sacred Heart

References

Catholic holy days
May observances
June observances
July observances
Holidays based on the date of Easter